In the 2018–19 season, NA Hussein Dey competed in the Ligue 1 for the 43rd season, as well as the Confederation Cup, and the Algerian Cup.

Pre-season

Mid-season

Overview

{| class="wikitable" style="text-align: center"
|-
!rowspan=2|Competition
!colspan=8|Record
!rowspan=2|Started round
!rowspan=2|Final position / round
!rowspan=2|First match
!rowspan=2|Last match
|-
!
!
!
!
!
!
!
!
|-
| Ligue 1

| 
| 11th
| 10 August 2018
| 26 May 2019
|-
| Algerian Cup

| Round of 64
| Quarter-final
| 27 December 2018
| 28 March 2019
|-
| Confederation Cup

| Preliminary round
| Group stage
| 27 November 2018
| 17 March 2019
|-
! Total

Ligue 1

League table

Results summary

Results by round

Matches

Algerian Cup

Confederation Cup

Preliminary round

First round

Play-off round

Group stage

Group D

Squad information

Playing statistics

|-
! colspan=12 style=background:#dcdcdc; text-align:center| Goalkeepers

|-
! colspan=12 style=background:#dcdcdc; text-align:center| Defenders

|-
! colspan=12 style=background:#dcdcdc; text-align:center| Midfielders

|-
! colspan=12 style=background:#dcdcdc; text-align:center| Forwards

|-
! colspan=12 style=background:#dcdcdc; text-align:center| Players transferred out during the season

Goalscorers

Squad list
As of August 10, 2018.

Transfers

In

Out

Notes

References

2018-19
NA Hussein Dey